Käpt’n Blaubär Club was a German television series for children. It was first aired on the channel Das Erste from 1993 to 2001. The programme was centred around Käpt'n Blaubär (Wolfgang Völz) and Hein Blöd (Edgar Hoppe) and also featured three bears called Yellow, Green and Red. Another important character was a carnivorous flower called Karin (Edith Hancke).

See also
 Blaubär und Blöd (2002 – 2008)

References

External links
 

German children's television series
1993 German television series debuts
2001 German television series endings
German television shows featuring puppetry
Nautical television series
Das Erste original programming
German-language television shows
Grimme-Preis for fiction winners